"Where I'm From" is a song co-written and recorded by Canadian country duo the Reklaws. The duo wrote the track with Gavin Slate, Travis Wood, and the track's producer Todd Clark. The song was released on a five-track EP of the same name, and became the lead single off the Reklaws' second studio album Sophomore Slump.

Background
The Reklaws stated: "Where I'm From' reminds us of our childhood where the majority of our time was spent at home, with family and neighbours who were our closest friends in our hometown which felt like the whole world." Released amidst the coronavirus pandemic in 2020, Jenna Walker stated, "I think this song will bring some brightness and light to everybody and remind them that this doesn’t have to be a fully negative time."

Critical reception
Katie Colley of ET Canada referred to the song as a "nostalgic new track" and a "reminder to reconnect with loved ones and appreciate the little things, now more than ever". Chris Parton of Sounds Like Nashville said the track is "filled with sunset-country sonics and the blood-harmony blend of voices raised under one roof in Cambridge, Ontario" and that "the heartwarming track will make you want to call up your family and reminisce". Allen Steinberg of Canadian Beats Media called the song a "touching duet".

Commercial performance
"Where I'm From" was certified Platinum by Music Canada on November 16, 2020, with over 80,000 sales. It reached a peak of #2 on the Billboard Canada Country chart dated September 5, 2020, It also peaked at #73 on the Canadian Hot 100, becoming their highest charting solo entry to date.

Music video
The official music video for "Where I'm From" premiered on May 8, 2020 and was directed by Ben Knechtel. The video is a combination of old family photos and home videos that show their journey from their childhood on their family farm to performing at large venues.

Track listings
Digital download - single
 "Where I'm From" – 3:31

Digital download - single
 "Where I'm From" – 3:31
 "Where I'm From" – 3:27(acoustic)

Digital download - Deluxe EP
 "Where I'm From" – 3:31
 "Beer Can" – 2:56
 "Karma" – 3:19
 "Godspeed" – 3:21
 "Where I'm From" – 3:27(acoustic)

Charts

Certifications

References
 

2020 songs
2020 singles
The Reklaws songs
Universal Music Canada singles
Songs written by Todd Clark
Songs written by Gavin Slate 
Songs written by Jenna Walker
Songs written by Stuart Walker (singer)
Songs written by Travis Wood (songwriter)
Song recordings produced by Todd Clark